Tadanori (written: 忠則, 忠度, 忠教, 忠憲, or 忠礼) is a masculine Japanese given name. Notable people with the name include:

, Imperial Japanese Army officer
, Japanese judoka
, Japanese kugyō
, Japanese daimyō
, Japanese samurai
, Japanese daimyō
, Japanese adult video director
, Japanese artist and illustrator

Japanese masculine given names